Miss Malaysia World 1965, the 3rd edition of the Miss World Malaysia pageant was held on October 9, 1965, at the Stadium Negara in Kuala Lumpur. Miss Malaysia World 1964, Leonie Foo crowned her successor, Clara de Run from Selangor at the end of the event. She then represented Malaysia at Miss World 1965 in London, United Kingdom.

Results

Contestants

Crossovers 
Contestants who previously competed/appeared at other international/national beauty pageants:
National competition

Miss Malaysia for Miss Universe
 1965 – Alice Woon (2nd Runner-Up)
 1965 – Nancy Blassan (3rd Runner-Up)
 1965 – Sherley Wong (Unplaced)

Miss Malaysia for Miss World
 1963 – Alice Woon (2nd Runner-Up)

Notes

References 

1965 beauty pageants
1965 in Malaysia
Miss World
Miss World Malaysia